Lacey Amelia Turner (born 28 March 1988) is an English actress. She is known for portraying the role of Stacey Slater on the BBC soap opera EastEnders (2004–2010, 2014–present), for which she has won over thirty awards, including four National Television Awards and ten British Soap Awards. She has also appeared on Bedlam, Switch (both 2012) and Our Girl (2013–2014).

Early life
Turner was born in Edgware, in the London Borough of Barnet, to Catholic parents Bev and Les. She was raised along with her two younger sisters in Hertfordshire, near the BBC television studios in Elstree. She had commented: "From my bedroom window you could see part of the square [the external filming lot for EastEnders], and you could hear them all filming at night. I used to say to my mum: "I wanna be on that!" It was whilst living there that Turner decided to become an actress.

At the age of 10, Turner trained at the Sylvia Young Theatre School, but left after a year stating that it "wasn't my cup of tea". She has since revealed that she was bullied whilst at school for being "too geeky". Instead, she attended a local girls' private school, Peterborough and Saint Margaret's School in Bushey and went to dance, singing and acting classes outside school.

Career

EastEnders

Turner's earliest work included appearances on stage and in advertisements (notably a Haribo advert).
In 2004, Turner went on to audition for the role of Demi Miller on the BBC soap opera EastEnders. Though she failed to get that part, she was instead given the role of Stacey, a new addition to the popular Slater family. She started in the soap the day after leaving school, and made her first appearance on-screen in November 2004. Turner speaks with Received Pronunciation, and had to affect a cockney accent for the role. Commenting on the role, Turner said: "I always dreamt of being on the show and so I can't believe that I've fulfilled my greatest ambition!" Since joining the show, her character has featured in numerous high-profile storylines, including abortion, drug abuse, a troubled relationship with her mother, discovering she has bipolar disorder, an affair with her father-in-law and the murder of her rapist Archie Mitchell (Larry Lamb).

Turner starred in a live episode of EastEnders on 19 February 2010 to celebrate the 25th anniversary of the soap opera. The live episode gained over 16.6 million viewers which saw Stacey's husband die after falling from a rooftop during a police chase before Stacey's confession that she murdered Archie Mitchell. After her co-star Charlie Clements who played her husband left in February 2010, EastEnders bosses declared that they are keen to retain Turner after proving her popularity with viewers, however, she announced her decision to leave the show in April 2010. She stated: "I'll miss Stacey and everyone in Albert Square very much but the time has come to try something different." Turner later revealed that she had agreed with Charlie Clements to leave EastEnders at the same time as him. Of the decision, Turner said: "Charlie and I always said we'd go at the same time. For quite a while I'd been saying I was going to go and kept realising I wasn't ready. But when Charlie said he was going last year I was like, 'Right, OK, I'm going too'." She departed on-screen on 25 December 2010.

On 6 December 2013, it was announced that Turner would be returning to EastEnders, to reprise her role as Stacey. Turner began filming in January 2014. She made her on-screen return on 7 February 2014 and departed on 25 March 2014. She returned full-time in August 2014. Since returning to the show she has featured in a highly acclaimed postpartum psychosis storyline.

Turner's character has proven popular with fans and critics, and the actress has won multiple awards for her portrayal.

Other work

In December 2010, Turner advertised Royal Mail campaign to remind people of Christmas postal deadlines. The following year, she was cast as Lia Shaman in the third series of Being Human. She appeared in its first episode broadcast on 23 January 2011, watched by 1.37 million viewers (5%). She reprised her role for the series finalé. In March 2011, she played Elizabeth Lavenza, the bride of Victor Frankenstein (played by Andrew Gower), in an adaptation of Mary Shelley's 1818 novel Frankenstein; or, The Modern Prometheus titled Frankenstein's Wedding, which aired on BBC Three, live from the derelict Kirkstall Abbey in Leeds, in front of an audience of 12,000.

Turner appeared alongside David Tennant, Billie Piper, David Morrissey, Jane Horrocks, Ashley Walters and Vicky McClure in the BBC One improvisational programme, True Love, which aired in June 2012. Also in June, she played the leading role of Ellie, a character who claims to see ghosts and spirits, in the second series of Bedlam. In October, she starred in the ITV2 supernatural drama series, Switch, which centres on the story of four young witches living in contemporary London. Turner's character is referred to as the "immaculately dressed" careerist Stella.

The actress played a young army recruit called Molly in a one-off 90-minute drama titled Our Girl. She began filming in BBC Elstree Studios in October 2012 and the film aired on BBC One on 24 March 2013. This was then followed by a five-part series which began airing on BBC One on 21 September 2014. Michelle Keegan took over from the second series in 2016.

In October 2012, Turner joined Asda Tickled Pink campaign. She has also done voice over work in the CITV programme, Goodbye Year Six and narrated BBC Three's Don't Just Stand There, I'm Having Your Baby. Turner also starred in radio dramas, The One about the Social Worker and Up the Junction, which aired on BBC Radio 4 in September 2013.

Personal life
Turner married Matt Kay in a private ceremony in Ibiza on 5 September 2017. On 25 February 2019, Turner announced that she was expecting a child with Kay, having previously suffered two miscarriages. On 12 July 2019, Turner gave birth to a daughter, Dusty Violet Kay. On 21 September 2020, the couple announced that Turner was pregnant with their second child. On 3 February 2021, Turner gave birth to a son, Trilby Fox Kay. 

In April 2021, she called for better support for parents who have suffered a miscarriage. Turner appeared on BBC Breakfast and said that the system "needs reforming".

Turner is good friends with EastEnders co-stars, Jessie Wallace and Natalie Cassidy.

Filmography

Awards and nominations

References

External links

 
 

1988 births
Living people
English soap opera actresses
English television actresses
English radio actresses
Alumni of the Sylvia Young Theatre School
Actresses from London
People from Edgware
21st-century English actresses